Regional elections were held in Venezuela on 16 December 2012 to elect state governors and state legislators. The result was a victory for the ruling United Socialist Party, which won the governorships of 20 of the 23 states, an increase from the 18 won in the 2008 elections. Voter turnout was 53%.

Gubernatorial elections

Amazonas

Anzoátegui

Apure

Aragua

Barinas

Bolívar

Carabobo

Cojedes

Delta Amacuro

Falcón

Guárico

Lara

Mérida

Miranda

Monagas

Nueva Esparta

Portuguesa

Sucre

Táchira

Trujillo

Vargas

Yaracuy

Zulia

References

Regional elections in Venezuela
Venezuela
2012 in Venezuela
December 2012 events in South America